Tabina, officially the Municipality of Tabina (Subanen: Benwa Tabina; Chavacano: Municipalidad de Tabina), is a 4th class municipality in the province of Zamboanga del Sur, Philippines. According to the 2020 census, it has a population of 25,734 people.

History
Tabina was formed out of the Municipality of Dimataling on August 16, 1961, by virtue of Executive Order No. 443 signed by President Carlos P. Garcia. Upon its creation, Tabina has twelve (12) barangays which comprised its original territory.

4 new barangays (Capisan, Doña Josefina, New Oroquita, San Francisco) were later created. When the Municipality of Pitogo was created, barangay Limbayan was detached from the Municipality of Tabina to be added to the new municipality, thus, resulting in a total number of fifteen (15) barangays within its jurisdiction.

Historically, the earliest settlers of Tabina were the Subanens who have settled in the different parts of the Zamboanga Peninsula. They are followed by the Muslims, and then the Christians. The name itself has many different origins, open to interpretation. One states that it comes from the inhabitants’ expression of “tabi-una”, a polite expression meaning “excuse me”. Another points out to the inhabitants' characteristic expression of being talkative which, in the local tongue, is being “tabi-an”. Meanwhile, the Muslim immigrants were said to be attracted by the abundance of local seashells known as “binga” in their native tongue. It also happened to be called “ubina”. The Christians who happened to pass by Tabina inquired about the name of the place and, always hearing “bina”, modified it to “Tabina” and the name has stuck ever since.
Most of Tabina is characterized as having steep mountains and undulating hills. The majority of the barangays tower to about 50 to 200 feet above sea level. There are no coastal plains or valleys in the municipality; the coasts themselves run down to shores and high cliffs.
There are several tourist attractions in Tabina as well. There's the Tambunan Beach and Marine Sanctuary, the Barangay Malim and Marine Sanctuary, Talisay Beach, and the Pod-ok Mangrove Boardwalk.

Geography
It is the southernmost part of Zamboanga del Sur, facing the area wherein the waters of Illana Bay flows out to the Moro Gulf. It is about 63 kilometers away from Pagadian City, the province's capital. Its boundaries are the municipality of Dimataling on the north, the Celebes Sea on the south, the municipality of Pitogo on the west, and another body of water, Illana Bay, on the east. Tabina can be reached via land through a provincial road passing through five municipalities so those who are thinking of going to Tabina should prepare for a long journey through rural places. The municipality has a land area of 8,690 hectares and these are distributed to the municipality's current 15 regular and de facto barangays.

Climate

Barangays

Tabina is politically subdivided into 15 barangays.

 Abong-abong
 Baganian
 Baya-baya
 Capisan
 Concepcion
 Culabay
 Doña Josefina
 Lumbia
 Mabuhay
 Malim
 Manicaan
 New Oroquieta
 Poblacion
 San Francisco
 Tultolan

Demographics

Economy

Education
Tertiary

 Josefina E. Cerilles State College (Tabina Campus)

Secondary

(Private)
 Saint Ambrose High School

(Public)
 Baganian National High School
 Concepcion National High School
 Culabay National High School
 Malim National High School
 Tabina National High School
 Tultolan National High School

Elementary

 Abong-Abong Elementary School
 Baganian Elementary School
 Capisan Elementary School
 Concepcion Elementary School
 Culabay Elementary School
 Lumbia Elementary School
 Mabuhay Elementary School
 Malim Elementary School
 San Antonio Elementary School (Baganian)
 San Francisco Elementary School
 San Roque Elementary School
 Tabina Central Elementary School
 Santo Domingo Elementary School (Malim)

Tourism
 Tambunan Beach and Marine Sanctuary

 Talisay Beach and Barangay Malim Marine Sanctuary

 Pod-ok Mangrove Boardwalk
 Baliti Beach Resort
 Baganian Beach Resort

Gallery
More Views

References

External links
 Tabina Profile at PhilAtlas.com
 [ Philippine Standard Geographic Code]
 Local Governance Performance Management System

Municipalities of Zamboanga del Sur
Establishments by Philippine executive order